Garzau-Garzin is a municipality in the district Märkisch-Oderland, in Brandenburg, Germany. It is formed by the villages of Garzau and Garzin.

Demography

See also
Märkische Schweiz Nature Park
Gladowshöhe

References

External links

Localities in Märkisch-Oderland